Bonamia rosea, commonly known as felty bellflower, is a herb in the family Convolvulaceae.

It blooms between May to October and produces white-pink-yellow flowers.

It is found on sand plains in the Mid West and Pilbara regions of Western Australia where it grows in stony sandy-clay soils.

References

rosea
Plants described in 1893
Taxa named by Ferdinand von Mueller